The 1951 Ohio Bobcats football team was an American football team that represented Ohio University in the Mid-American Conference (MAC) during the 1951 college football season. In their third season under head coach Carroll Widdoes, the Bobcats compiled a 5–4–1 record (2–2 against MAC opponents), finished in fourth place in the MAC, and outscored all opponents by a combined total of 167 to 141.  They played their home games in Peden Stadium in Athens, Ohio.

The team's statistical leaders included Ed Roberts with 564 rushing yards, Larry Lawrence with 407 passing yards, and Gene Nuxhall with 236 receiving yards. Offensive tackle Al Scheide was named to the Little All-America Team.

Schedule

References

Ohio
Ohio Bobcats football seasons
Ohio Bobcats football